Bennington High School may refer to:

Bennington High School (Bennington, Nebraska) in Bennington, Nebraska
Bennington High School (Bennington, Kansas) in Bennington, Kansas
Bennington High School (Bennington, Oklahoma) in Bennington, Oklahoma